Cedar Lawn Cemetery is the name of many cemeteries including:

 Cedar Lawn Memorial Park (Fremont, California)
 Cedar Lawn Cemetery (Jackson, Mississippi)
 Cedar Lawn Cemetery (Philadelphia, Mississippi)
 Cedar Lawn Cemetery, Paterson, New Jersey